Francis J. Mahoney (1897 – December 23, 1956) was an American lawyer and politician from New York.

Life
He was born in 1897. He graduated from Manhattan College in 1918; and from Fordham Law School. He married Catherine, and they had two daughters: Patricia (Mahoney) Cavallero and Maureen (Mahoney) Rice (1928–2012).

Mahoney was a member of the New York State Senate from 1943 until his death in 1956, sitting in the 164th, 165th, 166th, 167th, 168th, 169th and 170th New York State Legislatures. He was Minority Leader from 1952 to 1956.

He died on December 23, 1956, in St. Luke's Hospital in Manhattan, after a stomach operation.

His daughter Patricia (1925–2007) was married to Gene J. Cavallero Jr., co-owner of The Colony restaurant.

Sources

1897 births
1956 deaths
People from New York City
Democratic Party New York (state) state senators
Manhattan College alumni
Fordham University School of Law alumni
20th-century American politicians